Witt-Champe-Myers House is a historic home located at Dublin, Wayne County, Indiana. It was built in 1837–38, and is a two-story, Federal style painted brick detached dwelling.  It features a two-story front portico with Tuscan order columns on the first story and Doric order columns on the second.  Also on the property are the contributing one-room brick house (1837), small brick smokehouse, and brick spring house.

It was added to the National Register of Historic Places in 1995.

References

Houses on the National Register of Historic Places in Indiana
Federal architecture in Indiana
Houses completed in 1838
Buildings and structures in Wayne County, Indiana
National Register of Historic Places in Wayne County, Indiana